Ammunira was a king of Beirut in the mid-fourteenth century BCE. He is mentioned in several of the Amarna letters, and authored letters EA 141-43 (EA for 'el Amarna').

References

Phoenician kings
Amarna letters writers
14th-century BC rulers
14th-century BC Phoenician people
Phoenicians in the Amarna letters